Western Park is a park and surrounding suburb located in West End of Leicester. It is also a ward of the City of Leicester whose population at the 2011 census was 10,609.

While the park has a "blend of meadows, mature woods and hedgerows" the park also contains a large number of sporting facilities including a BMX track, a skate ramp, a baseball field, two bowling greens, five football pitches, six cricket pitches (all with associated changing facilities) and six tennis courts. Until the 1950s the Park's tennis courts, then located to the far west of the Park, were the home of Westcotes Church Tennis Club and then Westfields Lawn Tennis Club. The club later moved to a site on the nearby Eastfield Road; the courts on Western Park are now open to the public.

Since 2008, the full-sized baseball field at the southwest end of park has been home to the Leicester Blue Sox Baseball Club. The Blue Sox have been British Baseball Federation national baseball champions in 2009 and 2012. The club has adult and youth teams and is open to players of all ages and abilities.

Until May 2013 the former park warden's lodge was home to the environmental charity Groundworks Leicester & Leicestershire, formerly known as Environ. This building was called the "Eco House" after being converted as a show house, used to demonstrate ways of making homes more environmentally friendly. It was open to the public and held one-off events as well as receiving visits from local schools. The Eco House and the neighbouring recycling centre were part of the larger Groundwork UK network.

A voluntary group, The Friends of Western Park, works with the city council to "improve the park for everyone".

The area of Leicester sharing the park's name is a generally affluent area to the South and East of the park. The suburb also contains Dovelands Primary School which caters for 550 3–11-year olds, including nursery school children. St. Anne's Parish Church, and the aforementioned Westfields Tennis Club. The club has four floodlit courts and caters to both children and adults from the local area and beyond. Christ the King Roman Catholic primary school, rated "outstanding" by Ofsted hosts two sites, the infant site at the top of Western Park and the junior site further down on Glenfield Road.

Council Election result, 2011

Council Election result, 2007
Source:

Council By Election result, 1992

Council Election result, 1983

References

External links
Western Park Gazette – Full colour community magazine for homes and business in and around Leicester's Western Park
Dovelands Primary School
Friends of Western Park 
Western Park @ Leicester City Council
Westfields Lawn Tennis Club
Leicester Blue Sox Baseball Club

Leicester
Parks and open spaces in Leicestershire
Baseball venues in the United Kingdom